McComb is a city in Pike County, Mississippi, United States. As of the 2010 census, the city had a total population of 12,790. It is the principal city of the McComb, Mississippi Micropolitan Statistical Area.

History

19th century

McComb was founded in 1872 after Henry Simpson McComb of the New Orleans, Jackson and Great Northern Railroad, a predecessor of the Illinois Central Railroad (now part of the Canadian National Railway), decided to move the railroad's maintenance shops away from New Orleans, Louisiana, to avoid the attractions of that city's bars.

The railroad purchased land in Pike County. Three nearby communities, Elizabethtown, Burglund, and Harveytown, agreed to consolidate to form this town. Main Street developed with the downtown's shops, attractions, and business.

20th century
The rail center in McComb was one of flashpoints in the violent Illinois Central shopmen's strike of 1911.  Riots took place here that resulted in many injuries, at least three black strikebreakers killed, and authorities bringing in state militia to suppress the emergency soon after the strike started on September 30.

During the 1960s, McComb and nearby areas were the sites of extreme violence by KKK and other white supremacist opponents to the Civil Rights Movement. In 1961, SNCC conducted its first voter registration project in Mississippi in this city. White officials and local KKK members countered it with violence and intimidation to suppress black voters.

In 1961, Brenda Travis, Robert Talbert, and Ike Lewis were arrested for staging a sit in at a Greyhound station. They were charged with trespassing and kept in jail for 28 days. Following their release, Travis was expelled from school. In response to the expulsion and the murder of Herbert Lee, 115 students staged a walk out on October 4, 1961 known as the Burglund High School Walk Out. At the walk out, many students were beaten by the police and arrested. Students continued protesting by refusing to return to school until Travis was allowed to reenroll. As a result, they too were expelled. The 16 seniors who participated were unable to graduate. Travis' fate for participating in the march was more serious. Travis was arrested, again, and sent to a state juvenile facility without a trial. After 6 and a half months, Travis was released by the governor and exiled from Mississippi.

After whites severely beat several staff members, staff members being jailed for their involvement with the walkout, and receiving backlash from the community for putting students on the "frontlines", SNCC pulled out of the region in early 1962. They moved north in Mississippi to work in slightly less dangerous conditions.

In 1964, civil rights activists began the Mississippi Project and what would be called Freedom Summer, with teams returning to southwest Mississippi. They sang, "We'll Never Turn Back." SNCC members of the Council of Federated Organizations (COFO) returned to McComb in mid-July 1964 to work on voter registration. From late August 1964 through September, after passage of the Civil Rights Act of 1964, McComb was the site of eleven bombings directed against African Americans. Malcolm Boyd took part of COFO's Freedom House as a member of a clerical delegation to assist African-American voter registration.

The following summer, Congress passed the Voting Rights Act of 1965 authorizing federal oversight and enforcement to enable blacks to register and vote again in the South. In Mississippi, most blacks had been disenfranchised since 1890. Even with enforcement, it took time to overcome local white resistance to black voting. 

On October 20, 1977, a chartered plane carrying members and crew of rock band Lynyrd Skynyrd crashed in a swamp near McComb, killing lead singer Ronnie Van Zant, guitarist Steve Gaines, Steve's sister Cassie (a backup singer), road manager Dean Kilpatrick, as well as both  pilots.

In 2006, Zach Patterson was elected as McComb's first African American mayor. 

In 2018, voters in the city of McComb elected Quordiniah Lockley as mayor, and for the first time elected a city board consisting of an African American majority.

Geography

Climate
The climate in McComb is characterized by hot, humid summers and generally mild to cool winters.  According to the Köppen Climate Classification system, McComb has a humid subtropical climate, abbreviated "Cfa" on climate maps.

Demographics

2020 census

As of the 2020 United States Census, there were 12,413 people, 4,478 households, and 2,210 families residing in the city.

2010 census
As of the census of 2010, there were 12,790 people and 5,073 households in the city. The population density was 1,184 people per square mile (424/km2). There were 5,825 housing units at an average density of 500.6 per square mile (193.3/km2). The racial makeup of the city was 66.29% African American, 31.22% White, 0.91% Asian, 0.17% Native American,  0.05% Pacific Islander, 0.53% from other races, and 0.82% from two or more races. Hispanic or Latino of any race were 1.41% of the population.

2000 census
As of the 2000 census, there were 5,265 households, out of which 33.4% had children under the age of 18 living with them, 35.5% were married couples living together, 25.3% had a female householder with no husband present, and 35.2% were non-families. 32.0% of all households were made up of individuals, and 15.0% had someone living alone who was 65 years of age or older. The average household size was 2.47 and the average family size was 3.13.

In the city, the population was spread out, with 29.0% under the age of 18, 9.5% from 18 to 24, 24.7% from 25 to 44, 20.0% from 45 to 64, and 16.8% who were 65 years of age or older. The median age was 35 years. For every 100 females, there were 78.2 males. For every 100 females age 18 and over, there were 71.6 males. The median income for a household in the city was $26,507, and the median income for a family was $31,758. Males had a median income of $27,899 versus $17,402 for females. The per capita income for the city was $13,790. About 27.4% of families and 31.0% of the population were below the poverty line, including 43.7% of those under the age of 18 and 21.3% of those 65 and older.

Arts and culture 
An annual Earth Day Fest organized by Pike School of Art – Mississippi is celebrated in April on the Saturday of or following Earth Day. The Summit Street Unity Festival is celebrated annually on the third Saturday in October. The Black History Gallery annually celebrates Juneteenth.

Points of Interest 
 Black History Gallery
 McComb City Railroad Depot Museum
 Pike School of Art – Mississippi

Education
The City of McComb is served by the McComb School District. There are 7 schools in the district, Otken Elementary, Kennedy Early Childhood Center, Higgins Middle School, Denman Jr. High School, McComb High School, Business & Technology Center, and Summit Academy. The McComb and the surrounding Pike County area has three separate school districts, one private school, and a community college in the northern part of the county.
St. Alphonsus Catholic Church is located in McComb and provided classes kindergarten through seventh grade until the school closed in 2014.  McComb is also the location of Parklane Academy, a K4 through 12th grade private college preparatory school.  It is the first of its kind in the Pike County Area. It is located in the central McComb region. Southwest Mississippi Community College is located seven miles north of McComb, and northeast of Summit, MS. McComb High School is one of the 100 National Model Schools.

Infrastructure

Rail transportation

Amtrak, the national passenger rail system, provides service to McComb.  Amtrak trains 58 & 59, the City of New Orleans stop here.

Notable people
 Woodie Assaf, weather reporter, WLBT television (Jackson) 1953 to 2001
 Jimmy Boyd, singer, musician, and actor
 John Brady, head coach of Arkansas State University men's basketball team, former head coach of LSU Tigers
 Steve Broussard, NFL player for Green Bay Packers
 Adrian Brown, Major League baseball player with Pittsburgh Pirates, Boston Red Sox, Kansas City Royals and Texas Rangers
 Jackie Butler, former NBA player
 Cooper Carlisle, NFL player
 Castro Coleman, blues musician
 Jacqueline Y. Collins, Illinois state legislator 
 Corey Dickerson, MLB player with the Toronto Blue Jays
 Bo Diddley, blues singer
 Jarrod Dyson. Major League Baseball player with the Toronto Blue Jays
 Omar Kent Dykes, blues singer and guitarist
 James Govan, soul singer
 King Solomon Hill, early blues musician
 Donnie Izzett notable case regarding a missing college student from Cumberland, Maryland
 Vasti Jackson, Grammy nominated electric blues guitarist, singer, songwriter and record producer
 Little Freddie King,  American Delta blues guitarist
 Maxie Lambright, football coach at Louisiana Tech University, 1967-1978
 Robert "Squirrel" Lester, singer in soul music group The Chi-Lites.
 Bobby Lounge, blues pianist and songwriter
 Sam McCullum, NFL football wide receiver
 Albert Mollegen, Christian apologist
 Bucky Moore, NFL player
 Brandy Norwood singer and actress
 Willie Norwood, singer, father of Brandy and Ray J
 R. B. Nunnery, football player
 Steven Ozment, historian
 Edward Grady Partin, Teamsters Union figure, spent his last years in McComb
 Glover Quin, NFL free safety, Detroit Lions and Houston Texans
 Ray J, singer and actor
 La'Porsha Renae, singer, American Idol finalist
 Michael Farris Smith, writer
 Britney Spears, singer and actress
 Bryan Spears, film and television producer
 Jamie Lynn Spears, actress and singer
 Davion Taylor, NFL linebacker for Philadelphia Eagles
 Matt Tolbert, MLB player for Minnesota Twins
 Dan Tyler, songwriter, born in McComb in 1950 
 Charvarius Ward, NFL player

References

External links

 City of McComb official website

 
Cities in Mississippi
Cities in Pike County, Mississippi
Cities in McComb micropolitan area
Mississippi Blues Trail